The 2003 European Youth Summer Olympic Festival was the seventh edition of multi-sport event for European youths between the ages of 12 and 18. It was held in Paris, France, from 27 July to 3 August, with the opening and closing ceremonies at the Charléty Stadium. A total of ten sports were contested, featuring around 2000 athletes from 48 nations.

The hosting of the competition formed part of the buildup for the Paris bid for the 2012 Summer Olympics.

Sports

Participating nations

Medal table

Non-medalling nations:

References

Medal table
Tableau des médailles Paris - France (2003). French Olympic Committee. Retrieved on 2014-11-23.

External links
Official website (archived)
Gymnastics results

 
2003
European Youth Summer Olympic Festival
European Youth Summer Olympic Festival
European Youth Summer Olympic Festival
Multi-sport events in France
International sports competitions hosted by Paris
European Youth Summer Olympic Festival
Youth sport in France
European Youth Summer Olympic Festival
European Youth Summer Olympic Festival
European Youth Summer Olympic Festival